Hard-edge painting is painting in which abrupt transitions are found between color areas. Color areas are often of one unvarying color.  The Hard-edge painting style is related to Geometric abstraction, Op Art, Post-painterly Abstraction, and Color Field painting.

History of the term
The term was coined by writer, curator and Los Angeles Times art critic Jules Langsner, along with Peter Selz, in 1959, to describe the work of painters from California, who, in their reaction to the more painterly or gestural forms of Abstract expressionism, adopted a knowingly impersonal paint application and delineated areas of color with particular sharpness and clarity. This approach to abstract painting became widespread in the 1960s, though California was its creative center.

Other, earlier, movements, or styles have also contained the quality of hard-edgedness, for instance the Precisionists also displayed this quality to a great degree in their work. Hard-edge can be seen to be associated with one or more school of painting, but is also a generally descriptive term, for these qualities found in any painting. Hard-edged painting can be both figurative or nonrepresentational.

In the late 1950s, Langsner and Peter Selz, then professor at the Claremont Colleges, observed a common link among the recent work of John McLaughlin (1898–1976), Lorser Feitelson (1898–1978), Karl Benjamin (1925-2012), Frederick Hammersley (1919–2009) and Feitelson's wife Helen Lundeberg (1908–1999). The group of seven gathered at the Feitelson's home to discuss a group exhibition of this nonfigurative painting style. Curated by Langsner, Four Abstract Classicists opened at the San Francisco Museum of Art in 1959, then traveled to the Los Angeles County Museum of Art in Exposition Park. Helen Lundeberg was not included in the exhibit. These painters were featured in a touring exhibition during 2008 called "The Birth of the Cool" in California museums along with midcentury design, music and film.

Exhibition
Four Abstract Classicists was subtitled California Hard-edge by British art critic and curator Lawrence Alloway when it traveled to England and Ireland. The term came into broader use after Alloway used it to describe contemporary American geometric abstract painting featuring "economy of form," "fullness of color," "neatness of surface," and the nonrelational arrangement of forms on the canvas.

In 1964, a second major hard-edge exhibition curated by Jules Langsner was held at the Pavilion Gallery in Balboa, CA (also known as the Newport Pavilion) with the cooperation of the Ankrum Gallery, Esther Robles Gallery, Felix Landau Gallery, Ferus Gallery and Heritage Gallery of Los Angeles.  This was called, simply, California Hard-edge painting. Included in this show were Florence Arnold, John Barbour, Larry Bell, Karl Benjamin, John Coplans, Lorser Feitelson, Frederick Hammersley, June Harwood, Helen Lundeberg, John McLaughlin, and Dorothy Waldman.

In 2000, Tobey C. Moss curated Four Abstract Classicists Plus One at her gallery in Los Angeles. The exhibit again featured John McLaughlin, Feitelson, Hammersley, and Benjamin, and added Lundeberg as the fifth of the original Hard-edge painters.  In 2003, Louis Stern Fine Arts showed a retrospective exhibition for Lorser Feitelson entitled Lorser Feitelson and the invention of Hard-edge painting, 1945–1965. The same year, NOHO MODERN showed the works of June Harwood in an exhibition entitled June Harwood: Hard-edge painting Revisited, 1959–1969.  Art critic Dave Hickey solidified the place of these 6 artists in: The Los Angeles School: Karl Benjamin, Lorser Feitelson, Frederick Hammersley, June Harwood, Helen Lundeberg, and John McLaughlin.  The exhibition was held at the Ben Maltz Gallery of the Otis Art Institute in Los Angeles in 2004-2005.

The style
This style of hard-edge geometric abstraction recalls the earlier work of Kasimir Malevich, Wassily Kandinsky, Theo van Doesburg, and Piet Mondrian. Other artists associated with Hard-edge painting include Herb Aach, Josef Albers, Richard Anuszkiewicz, Max Bill, Ilya Bolotowsky, Herbert Busemann, Ralph Coburn, Nassos Daphnis, Ronald Davis, Gene Davis, Robyn Denny, Howard Mehring, Burgoyne Diller, Burhan Dogancay, John Ferren, Peter Halley, Al Held, Robert Indiana, Ellsworth Kelly, Jack Youngerman, Günther C. Kirchberger, Alexander Liberman, Agnes Martin, George L. K. Morris, Marion Nicoll, Kenneth Noland, Ad Reinhardt, Deborah Remington, Bridget Riley, Ludwig Sander, David Simpson, Leon Polk Smith, Julian Stanczak, Jeffrey Steele, Frank Stella, Myron Stout, Leo Valledor, Victor Vasarely, Charmion von Wiegand, Neil Williams, John Stephan, Larry Zox, Mino Argento and Barbro Östlihn .

See also

References

Sources
NOHO MODERN (2003) June Harwood: Hard-Edge Painting Revisited, 1959–1969 exhibition catalogue, 
Louis Stern Fine Arts (2003) Lorser Feitelson and the Invention of Hard-Edge Painting, 1945–1965 exhibition catalogue, 
Moss, Tobey C. (2000). Four Abstract Classicists Plus One exhibition catalogue, 
Nittve, et al. (1998). Sunshine & Noir: Art in LA 1960–1997. Louisiana Museum of Modern Art.
Mastin, Catharine. (2022). Marion Nicoll: Life & Work. Toronto: Art Canada Institute, 2022.

External links
Guggenheim collection online 
Hard-edge Painting - Art Movement and Style Overview on Art Story Foundation 
British artist Robyn Denny

American art movements
Artists from California
Contemporary art
Modern art
Western art